Bathing Beauty is a 1944 musical film starring Red Skelton, Basil Rathbone, and Esther Williams, and directed by George Sidney.

Although this was not Williams' screen debut, it was her first Technicolor musical. The film was initially to be titled "Mr. Co-Ed", with Red Skelton having top billing. However, once MGM executives watched the first cut of the film, they realized that Esther Williams' role should be showcased more, and changed the title to "Bathing Beauty", giving her prominent billing and featuring her bathing-suit clad figure on the posters.

The film is also Janis Paige's film debut. After this film, Paige would go to Warner Brothers to make such films as Of Human Bondage, Hollywood Canteen, and Romance on the High Seas. In later years, Paige would return to Metro-Goldwyn-Mayer in few films.

Plot

In Los Angeles, songwriter Steve Elliot (Red Skelton) prepares to marry Caroline Brooks (Esther Williams), who has pledged to give up her job as a college swimming instructor. Likewise, Steve plans to quit his songwriting career, even though New York producer George Adams (Basil Rathbone) has already hired him to write new songs for a water ballet show.

When George overhears Steve discussing his "retirement" with Caroline, he vows to prevent it and enlists Maria Dorango (Jacqueline Dalya), an aspiring actress posing as a Latin-American singer, to help him. Moments after a justice of the peace pronounces the redheaded Steve and Caroline man and wife, Maria rushes in, claiming that Steve is her husband and the father of her three redheaded children, which she has paraded in at that moment. Although Steve pleads his innocence, Caroline storms off in a rage and returns to her teaching post at Victoria College in New Jersey. A determined Steve and his friend, Carlos Ramírez, follow her there, but are denied entrance to the all-female school.

Later, in a New York nightclub, Steve meets drunken lawyer Chester Klazenfrantz (Donald Meek), and learns that Klazenfrantz has been hired to change the charter of Victoria College, which has never officially designated itself as all-female. Armed with this information, Steve returns to Victoria and insists on applying for admission. Unaware of Caroline's relationship to Steve, Dean Clinton (Nana Bryant) suggests to the faculty that he be admitted for a two-week probationary period, during which time they would give him 100 demerits, which would qualify him for expulsion before Parents Day.

Once enrolled, Steve tries to speak with Caroline, but she refuses to listen to his explanations and tells him she is seeking an annulment. Later, in music class, stodgy Professor Hendricks (Francis Pierlot) attempts to discredit Steve, whose presence on campus has created a furor among the co-eds, by ordering him to write his own version of the Scottish ballad Loch Lomond and teach the next day's class. With help from several talented students, Carlos, the music teaching assistant (Ethel Smith), and Steve's friend Harry James and his orchestra, Steve meets Hendricks' challenge and is awarded an "A".

That night, Steve visits Caroline at her house, but is turned out after Willis Evans (Bill Goodwin), a conservative botany professor who is in love with Caroline, arrives. When Caroline realizes that Steve is hiding in her closet, spying on her, she commands Willis' Great Dane, Duke, to guard the closet door, while reminding Steve that unless he is in his room in five minutes, he will be expelled for breaking curfew. With only seconds to spare, Steve manages to trick the dog long enough to escape back to his dingy basement room. Steve is then visited by George, who threatens to vilify him in the press unless he finishes his songs. When Steve swears deadly revenge on the person who hired Maria, however, George backs down and offers to help Steve do his homework. Concerned about the approaching Parents Day, Dean Clinton, meanwhile, commands Steve's professors, who have penalized him with only fifty-five demerits, to bear down on him. To that end, Mme. Zarka (Ann Codee), Steve's ruthlessly strict ballet teacher, forces him to wear a tutu and dance with the co-eds, but Steve once again rises to the occasion.

A now desperate Dean Clinton asks Caroline to go out with Steve and ensure that he arrives back at Victoria after the curfew. Caroline agrees, but during the evening, Steve convinces her of his innocence, and as they drive back to school, they make plans to return to California together. Unbeknownst to them, Maria is on campus, looking to expose George, who has been trying to get rid of her, to Steve. At the same time, a campus sorority descends on Steve's room, hoping to initiate him, and Jean Allenwood (Jean Porter), another co-ed, shows up with news that her parents and Dean Clinton are on their way over to inspect his room. As Steve desperately hides all the women in two closets and keeps Caroline from discovering Maria, George unexpectedly arrives. Although Steve succeeds in hiding George and himself and fooling Dean Clinton and the Allenwoods, Maria soon makes her presence known to Caroline, who once again leaves in a fury. Later, Steve promises to write songs for George's water ballet show on condition he make Caroline the star. George agrees, and after Maria is finally able to tell Caroline the truth, Caroline happily reunites with Steve, who then gives George a thrashing.

Cast

Production
Skelton was advised to shave his red chest hair for the swimming sequences. He protested and after conferencing with his wife, only cut the hair once the studio paid him $200 in cash and saved all of the curls in a plastic bag. Another scene with Skelton proved difficult to complete with his character trapped in a house with a large aggressive dog outside. The scene was due to be scrapped until Buster Keaton visited the set and quickly suggested a satisfactory resolution.

The pool sequences were shot on location at the Lakeside Country Club in San Fernando Valley. The film was shot during January and the grass on the rolling country club lawns was dead and brown. Director George Sidney brought in a paint crew and had the dead grass spray painted green, which lasted the entire week of shooting. However, that ruined the grass, and the studio had to send in crews in the spring to re-seed the lawn.

Williams' date to the first preview of the film in Pomona was her future husband Sergeant Ben Gage.

Release
The film premiered at the Astor Theater in New York. For the event, MGM publicity set up a six story-tall billboard of Williams diving into Times Square with a large sign that said "Come on in. The water's fine!"

Critical response
Response for the film was "glowing", as Williams wrote in her autobiography. A 1944 review from the New York Times scoffed at the title, but also wrote: "Miss Williams' talents as a swimmer—not to mention her other attributes—make any title the studio wants to put on it okay by us. When she eels through the crystal blue water in a rosy-red bathing suit or splashes in limpid magnificence in the gaudy water carnival which John Murray Anderson has brought to pass, she's a bathing beauty for our money, even though dragged in by the heels. In other words, "Bathing Beauty" is a colorful shower of music, comedy, and dance. As July pants hotly on June's heels, it is a pleasant refreshment to have at hand."

Box office
With the film's wonderful tunes and extravagant water sequences, Bathing Beauty was a smash at the box office. According to MGM records, the movie earned $3,284,000 in the US and Canada, and $3,608,000 elsewhere, resulting in a profit of $2,132,000. It was one of the most popular movies of 1946 in France with admissions of 5,438,665.

Home media
 On July 17, 2007, Turner Entertainment released Bathing Beauty on DVD as part of the Esther Williams Spotlight Collection, Volume 1. The 5 disc set contained digitally remastered versions of several of Williams' films, including Easy to Wed (1946), On an Island with You (1948), Neptune's Daughter (1949), and Dangerous When Wet (1953)

Influence
The 6-minute ballet class sequence was used in The Clown, a 1953 film inspired by The Champ (1931), which stars Skelton as a once-famous Ziegfeld Follies star.

Several moments from the film became famous, one such scene in which swimmers dive past one another into the pool and water stunts involving Williams, including her being received as a queen emerging from the water, her high swan dive, and her being surrounded by several other swimmers who form a circle. The overhead shots of these elaborate choreographed sequences became iconic, especially for Williams and choreographer Busby Berkeley.

The finale water ballet sequence has been parodied several times, most famously in The Great Muppet Caper (1981), with Miss Piggy, in the Mel Brooks comedy History of the World, Part I (1981), briefly in the "Be Our Guest" sequence in the Disney movie Beauty and the Beast (1991), and in The Simpsons episode "Bart of Darkness" (1994), with Lisa Simpson.

The film is recognized by American Film Institute in these lists:
 2006: AFI's Greatest Movie Musicals – Nominated

Soundtrack
The soundtrack features many on-screen performances of big band greats of the era: Harry James, Xavier Cugat, Ethel Smith, Helen Forrest, and Lina Romay.

 "Magic is the Moonlight (Te quiero, dijiste)" - Carlos Ramírez (in Spanish) with the Xavier Cugat Orchestra
 "I'll Take the High Note" - played during the opening credits, then Red Skelton, Jean Porter, Janis Paige, Carlos Ramírez, and Helen Forrest
 "Bim, Bam, Bum" - Lina Romay with the Xavier Cugat Orchestra
 "Trumpet Blues and Cantabile" - Harry James and His Music Makers with Harry James on trumpet
 "By the Waters of Minnetonka: an Indian Love Song" - Ethel Smith
 "Tico-Tico no Fubá" - Ethel Smith
 "Alma llanera" - Lina Romay with the Xavier Cugat Orchestra
 "Hora staccato" - Harry James, Harry James and His Music Makers
 "I Cried for You" - Helen Forrest, Harry James and His Music Makers
 "Boogie Woogie" - Harry James and His Music Makers
 "The Thrill of a New Romance" - Xavier Cugat Orchestra

See also
List of American films of 1944

References

External links

 
 
 
 Bathing Beauty review at Red-Skelton.info

1944 films
1944 musical comedy films
1944 romantic comedy films
American musical comedy films
American romantic musical films
Films set in New Jersey
Films directed by George Sidney
Metro-Goldwyn-Mayer films
Swimming films
American romantic comedy films
1940s English-language films
1940s American films